Eino Albin Raunio (18 January 1909, in Sääksmäki – 18 March 1979, in Forssa) was a Finnish politician. He was the minister of finance from 1968 to 1970. He was a member of the Parliament of Finland from 1939 to 1970, representing the Social Democratic Party of Finland (SDP).

References

1909 births
1979 deaths
People from Valkeakoski
People from Häme Province (Grand Duchy of Finland)
Social Democratic Party of Finland politicians
Ministers of Finance of Finland
Members of the Parliament of Finland (1939–45)
Members of the Parliament of Finland (1945–48)
Members of the Parliament of Finland (1948–51)
Members of the Parliament of Finland (1951–54)
Members of the Parliament of Finland (1954–58)
Members of the Parliament of Finland (1958–62)
Members of the Parliament of Finland (1962–66)
Members of the Parliament of Finland (1966–70)
Finnish people of World War II